The Winton Formation is a Cretaceous geological formation in central-western Queensland, Australia. It is late Albian to early Turonian in age. The formation blankets large areas of central-western Queensland. It consists of sedimentary rocks such as sandstone, siltstone and claystone. The sediments that make up these rocks represent the remnants of the river plains that filled the basin left by the Eromanga Sea - an inland sea that covered large parts of Queensland and central Australia at least four times during the Early Cretaceous. Great meandering rivers, forest pools and swamps, creeks, lakes and coastal estuaries all left behind different types of sediment.

In some areas, the Winton Formation is over 400 metres thick. To bring with them such a huge amount of sediment, the rivers that flowed across these plains must have been comparable in size to the present-day Amazon or Mississippi rivers. As more and more sediment was brought in, the margins of the inland sea slowly contracted. By around 95 million years ago, the deposition was complete and the inland sea would never be seen again.

By virtue of its age and the environmental conditions under which the rocks it consists of were deposited, the Winton Formation represents one of the richest sources of dinosaur fossils anywhere in Australia.

Fauna 
A fossil footprint-(ichnite), Wintonopus, found with two other dinosaur genera footprints at the Lark Quarry in Australia, c.f. Tyrannosauropus and Skartopus, have been found in the Winton Formation.

Dipnoi

Actinopterygii

Crocodyliformes

Dinosaurs

Pterosaurs

Flora

See also 
 Lark Quarry Conservation Park
 List of dinosaur-bearing rock formations
 South Polar region of the Cretaceous

References 

Geologic formations of Australia
Cretaceous System of Australia
Early Cretaceous Australia
Albian Stage
Cenomanian Stage
Turonian Stage
Sandstone formations
Siltstone formations
Coal in Australia
Shale formations
Fluvial deposits
Ichnofossiliferous formations
Fossiliferous stratigraphic units of Oceania
Paleontology in Queensland
Formations
Formations